Théo Ngwabidje Kasi (born 27 March 1971) is a politician from the Democratic Republic of the Congo who is the Governor of South Kivu Province since 9 April 2019.

Political career 
In 2021, he suspended 6 Chinese mining companies in South Kivu over environmental violations.

Personal life 
He is married to Mrs. Coralie Asseli Kasi and is father of 4 children. He is a Christian.

References 

Living people
1971 births
People from South Kivu
21st-century Democratic Republic of the Congo politicians
Democratic Republic of the Congo Christians